R C Ziegler and Son is a firm of monumental masons in Queensland, Australia. They built many heritage-listed war memorials in Queensland.

History 
The firm was established in Toowoomba circa 1902 and undertook monumental masonry commissions throughout south-western Queensland. The family company moved to Bundaberg where it was operating until the mid 1980s. In 2016, it is based once again in Toowoomba serving Queensland and northern New South Wales under the name RC Ziegler Monumentals.
The firm closed in 2013.

Significant works 

 1920: Goombungee War Memorial
 1923: Cooyar War Memorial
 1924: Charleville War Memorial
1926: Cunnamulla War Memorial Fountain
 1949: Bundaberg War Nurses Memorial

References 

Ziegler
Toowoomba
Bundaberg
Companies based in Queensland
Companies established in 1902